This is a list of Malaysian films produced and released in 2023. Most of these films are produced in the Malay language, but there also a significant number of them that are produced in Tamil, English, and Mandarin

Malay Language Movie

Tamil Language Movie

References

Malaysia
2023
2023 in Malaysia